Tin Heng is one of the 39 constituencies in the Yuen Long District of Hong Kong. The constituency returns one district councillor to the Yuen Long District Council, with an election every four years.

Tin Heng constituency is loosely based on Tin Heng Estate in Tin Shui Wai with estimated population of 20,465.

Councillors represented

Election results

2010s

2000s

Notes

References

Tin Shui Wai
Constituencies of Hong Kong
Constituencies of Yuen Long District Council
2003 establishments in Hong Kong
Constituencies established in 2003